Vladimir Novikov may refer to:
Vladimir Novikov (gymnast) (born 1970), Soviet artistic gymnast
Vladimir Novikov (water polo) (1937–1980), Soviet water polo player
Vladimir Novikov (politician) (1907–2000), Soviet politician
Vladimir Novikov (politician, born 1960), Russian politician
Vladimir Novikov (politician, born 1966), Russian politician